SuperBrawl VII was the seventh SuperBrawl professional wrestling pay-per-view (PPV) event produced by World Championship Wrestling (WCW). The event took place on February 23, 1997 from the Cow Palace in San Francisco, California.

Storylines
The event featured wrestlers from pre-existing scripted feuds and storylines. Wrestlers portrayed villains, heroes, or less distinguishable characters in the scripted events that built tension and culminated in a wrestling match or series of matches.

Event

Syxx pinned Dean Malenko to win the WCW World Cruiserweight Championship after hitting him with the title belt. Eddy Guerrero interfered late in the match and tried to stop Syxx from hitting Malenko, but inadvertently caused Malenko to be hit.

Buff Bagwell was disqualified when the nWo rushed the ring after a Diamond Cutter by Diamond Dallas Page.

Jeff Jarrett pinned Steve McMichael after hitting him with a briefcase thrown to him by Debra. As a result of this victory, Jarrett was allowed to join the Four Horsemen.

Lex Luger did not come down to the ring for the WCW World Tag Team Championship match until late in the match after The Giant was powerbombed by Kevin Nash. Nash submitted to the Torture Rack, followed by the Giant pinning Scott Hall after a chokeslam.

Hollywood Hogan pinned Roddy Piper after Randy Savage interfered by breaking up a submission and giving Hogan brass knuckles to strike Piper with. Piper was originally awarded the decision by submission with a sleeper hold after Hogan failed to respond after having his arm raised three times, but referee Mark Curtis restarted the match after Hogan was ruled to have had his foot under the ropes. Hogan, however, clearly did not have his feet under the ropes when his hand fell the third time; Savage was supposed to pull Hogan under the ropes but did so too late. Savage and Hogan then attacked Piper post-match, followed by Savage turning heel and joining the nWo.

Aftermath
Eric Bischoff stripped Luger and Giant of the tag team titles the next night on Nitro due to Luger not getting a proper medical clearance before Bischoff left the previous week's Nitro.

Results

References

External links
SuperBrawl VII

SuperBrawl 7
Professional wrestling in San Francisco
1997 in San Francisco
Events in San Francisco
1997 World Championship Wrestling pay-per-view events
February 1997 events in the United States